Claytonia exigua is a species of wildflower known by the common names serpentine springbeauty and pale claytonia, in the family Montiaceae.

It is native to western North America from British Columbia to Idaho to California, where it grows in a number of habitat types, including plant communities on serpentine soils.

Description
Claytonia exigua is a fleshy annual herb producing a patch of erect or leaning stems up to about 15 centimeters tall.

The thick leaves are linear in shape and fingerlike near the base of the plant and crescent to disc-shaped farther up the stem. The plant is hairless and waxy and varies in color from green to pinkish, grayish, or brownish.

The inflorescence holds several flowers on drooping pedicels which turn erect as the plant develops fruit. The flower has five lobed petals each a few millimeters long and in shades of pink, white, or pink-streaked white.

The fruit is a capsule less than three millimeters long containing a few tiny seeds.

References

External links

Flora North America
 Calflora Database: Claytonia exigua (Little spring beauty,  Serpentine springbeauty)
Jepson Manual Treatment of Claytonia exigua
UC CalPhotos gallery of Claytonia exigua

exigua
Flora of British Columbia
Flora of California
Flora of Idaho
Flora of Nevada
Flora of Oregon
Flora of Washington (state)
Flora of the Klamath Mountains
Flora of the Sierra Nevada (United States)
Natural history of the California chaparral and woodlands
Natural history of the California Coast Ranges
Natural history of the Central Valley (California)
Natural history of the Peninsular Ranges
Natural history of the San Francisco Bay Area
Natural history of the Santa Monica Mountains
Natural history of the Transverse Ranges
Taxa named by Asa Gray
Taxa named by John Torrey
Flora without expected TNC conservation status